Mairi Milne (also known as Mairi Herd) is a Scottish curler and curling coach.

Teams

Record as a coach of national teams

Private life
Her sister Claire Milne is also a curler and a coach. The sisters were longtime teammates.

References

External links
 
 
 Team Muirhead Power Their Way To New International Title | British Curling
 Latvian Mixed Doubles Curling Cup – the roaring game blog
 Mercure Perth Masters – Your commentators for the live semi final game of Baumann v Brewster Mairi Milne and Rob Niven
 Skip Cottage Curling: 1991 (1991 video inside)

Living people
Scottish female curlers
Scottish curling champions
Scottish curling coaches
Year of birth missing (living people)